Acoustic emission (AE) is the phenomenon of radiation of acoustic (elastic) waves in solids that occurs when a material undergoes irreversible changes in its internal structure, for example as a result of crack formation or plastic deformation due to aging, temperature gradients, or external mechanical forces.

In particular, AE occurs during the processes of mechanical loading of materials and structures accompanied by structural changes that generate local sources of elastic waves. This results in small surface displacements of a material produced by elastic or stress waves generated when the accumulated elastic energy in a material or on its surface is released rapidly.

The waves generated by sources of AE are of practical interest in structural health monitoring (SHM), quality control, system feedback, process monitoring, and other fields. In SHM applications, AE is typically used to detect, locate, and characterise damage.

Phenomena
Acoustic emission is the transient elastic waves within a material, caused by the rapid release of localized stress energy. An event source is the phenomenon which releases elastic energy into the material, which then propagates as an elastic wave. Acoustic emissions can be detected in frequency ranges under 1 kHz, and have been reported at frequencies up to 100 MHz, but most of the released energy is within the 1 kHz to 1 MHz range. Rapid stress-releasing events generate a spectrum of stress waves starting at 0 Hz, and typically falling off at several MHz.

The three major applications of AE techniques are: 1) source location – determine the locations where an event source occurred; 2) material mechanical performance – evaluate and characterize materials and structures; and 3) health monitoring – monitor the safe operation of a structure, for example, bridges, pressure containers, pipelines, etc.

More recent research has focused on using AE to not only locate but also to characterise the source mechanisms such as crack growth, friction, delamination, matrix cracking, etc. This would give AE the ability to tell the end user what source mechanism is present and allow them to determine whether structural repairs are necessary.
 
AE can be related to an irreversible release of energy. It can also be generated from sources not involving material failure, including friction, cavitation, and impact.

Uses

The application of acoustic emission to nondestructive testing of materials typically takes place between 20 kHz and 1 MHz. Unlike conventional ultrasonic testing, AE tools are designed for monitoring acoustic emissions produced by the material during failure or stress, and not on the material's effect on externally generated waves. Part failure can be documented during unattended monitoring. The monitoring of the level of AE activity during multiple load cycles forms the basis for many AE safety inspection methods, that allow the parts undergoing inspection to remain in service.

The technique is used, for example, to study the formation of cracks during the welding process, as opposed to locating them after the weld has been formed with the more familiar ultrasonic testing technique.

In materials under active stress, such as some components of an airplane during flight, transducers mounted in an area can detect the formation of a crack at the moment it begins propagating. A group of transducers can be used to record signals and then locate the precise area of their origin by measuring the time for the sound to reach different transducers.

Long-term continuous monitoring for acoustic emissions is valuable for detecting cracks forming in pressure vessels and pipelines transporting liquids under high pressures. Standards for the use of acoustic emission for nondestructive testing of pressure vessels have been developed by the ASME, ISO, and the European Community.

This technique is used for estimation of corrosion in reinforced concrete structures.

In addition to nondestructive testing, acoustic emission monitoring has applications in process monitoring. Applications where acoustic emission monitoring has successfully been used include detecting anomalies in fluidized beds and end points in batch granulation.

See also
Accelerometer
Seismometer

References

External links and further reading
 History of the Latin American Working Group on Acoustic Emission
 Wolfgang Sachse, Kusuo Yamaguchi, James Roget, AEWG (Association) books.google.co.uk 100 page entries from search criteria: AE within this text
 
 

Acoustics
Materials science
Nondestructive testing